The Old Queen's Head is a pub at 14 Pond Hill, Sheffield, South Yorkshire, England. It is a 15th-century timber framed building and the oldest surviving domestic building in Sheffield. It is now Grade II* listed.

History
The Old Queens Head was built . However, the earliest known written record of the building is in a 1582 inventory of the estate of George Talbot, 6th Earl of Shrewsbury that included the furnishings of this building, which was then called "The hawle at the Poandes" or "Hall i' th' Ponds".

As a part of the Earl's estate, the building may have been a banqueting hall for parties hunting wildfowl in the nearby ponds. These ponds, which formed in the area where the Porter Brook meets the River Sheaf, are now gone, but gave rise to the local names Pond Street, Pond Hill (formerly Pond Well Hill), and Ponds Forge.

By the beginning of the 19th century the building was being used as a house. In 1840 a pub called the Old Queen's Head was opened in the building next door. Sometime after 1862 the pub expanded into the former Hall i' th' Ponds. Late in the 19th century, alterations and additions were made to the rear of the building.

The Queen in the pub's current name is likely to refer to Mary, Queen of Scots, who was imprisoned in Sheffield from 1570 to 1584.

The building has been Grade II* listed since 1952. It was refurbished in 1993 when it was controlled by the Tom Cobleigh pub company. It is now controlled by Thwaites Brewery.

See also
Listed buildings in Sheffield

References

Sources

External links

Buildings and structures completed in 1475
Grade II* listed buildings in Sheffield
Grade II* listed pubs in England
History of Sheffield
Houses completed in the 15th century
Pubs in South Yorkshire
Timber framed buildings in Yorkshire
Timber framed pubs in England